Khoshab (also Romanized as Khoshāb, Khowshāb, and Khūshāb) is a village in Soltanabad Rural District, in the Central District of Khoshab County, Razavi Khorasan Province, Iran. At the 2006 census, its population was 445, in 142 families.

References 

Populated places in Khoshab County